Knut Aalefjær (born 21 December 1974 in Bærum) is a Norwegian jazz musician (drums and percussion), and composer, educated at the Norwegian Academy of Music. He is known as an eminent drummer who provide significant contributions in the Helge Lien Trio, the band Geir Lysne Listening Ensemble, with the vocalist Live Maria Roggen, the band of Kristin Asbjørnsen (known from Dadafon, Krøyt, and Nymark Collective), and many others.

Career
During his studies at Norwegian Academy of Music he and fellow students Lars Andreas Haug (tuba) and Vidar Saether (saxophone?, established the band Moment's Notice with a release in 2003. He was also a member of orchestras Musikkflekken Workshop Big Band and ImproVice Versa, and on releases with the Geir Lysnes Listening Ensemble, as well as in pianist Helge Lien's Trio with Frode Berg (bass), on six recordings. With Great Curves, he also released the recording Rotoscope (2001), were the band members are Christine Sandtorv (vocal), Rune Brøndbo (keyboards), Lars Horntveth (saxophon), Anders Mjøs (keyboards), and Rob Waring (percussion).

Aalefjær is a commonly used musician in Oslo's musical life. With Elin Rosseland he has played on the record (Moment, 2004), in addition (in a trio with Staffan Svensson trumpet) performed composition of Eyvind Skeie and Geir Lysne for dissolution of the union (with Sweden) Grenseløse Gud in collaboration with Forsvarets musikk, Oslo Chorale Selskap and Den norske kirke (2005). He has also played with Det Norske Blåseensemble at the Big Band Festival 2004.

Aalefjær has also been involved in studio album Blood Inside to the Norwegian band Ulver in 2005.

From 2010 he joined the trio with Ruth Wilhelmine Meyer (vocals), and Elfi Sverdrup (vocals) and Lars Andreas Haug (tuba), and the band became a quartet. They released the album Akku 5 (2011).

Discography

In the main lineup
2002: Spiral Circle (DIW Japan), with Helge Lien Trio
2003: Asymmetrics (DIW Japan) with Helge Lien Trio
2003/2004): Moment's Notice (Mnemosyne Productions/Sonor Rec.) (Elektronika/Rock) (4 versions)
2005: Helge Lien Trio – Live (Curling Legs)
2006: To The Little Radio (DIW) with Helge Lien Trio
2008: My Letter to the World – Words By Emily Dickinson (Nordic) with Hanne Tveter
2009: The Night Shines Like The Day (EmArcy/Universal), with Kristin Asbjørnsen
2011: Min Song Og Hjarteskatt (Kirkelig Kulturverksted) with Beate S. Lech
2011: Akku 5 (NorCD) as drummer in a quartet with Ruth Wilhelmine Meyer
2013: I'll Meet You in the Morning (EmArcy/Universal) with Kristin Asbjørnsen

As sidemann
2001: Rotoscope – Great Curves (Jester Records) with Andreas Mjøs, here as well as a composer
2002: Aurora Borealis – Nordic Lights (Suite For Jazz Orchestra) (ACT), with Geir Lysne
2002: Objects of Desire (Albedo) with Oslo Sinfonietta conducted by Christian Eggen
2002: Iter.Viator. (Jester Records), with Star of Ash
2003: Korall (ACT), with Geir Lysne Listening Ensemble (guest: Sondre Bratland)
2003: Moment (NorCD) with Elin Rosseland Vuggi
2004: Lost in Reverie (Mnemosyne Productions), with Peccatum
2005: Blood Inside (Jester Records) with Ulver (Elektronica/Rock)
2006: Boahjenásti – The North Star  (ACT), with Geir Lysne Listening Ensemble
2007: Circuit Songs (Jazzland Recordings) with Live Maria Roggen
2008: The Thread (Candlelight Records USA), with Starofash

References

20th-century Norwegian drummers
21st-century Norwegian drummers
Norwegian jazz drummers
Male drummers
Norwegian jazz composers
Male jazz composers
Living people
1974 births
Norwegian Academy of Music alumni
Musicians from Kristiansand
20th-century drummers
Peccatum members
20th-century Norwegian male musicians
21st-century Norwegian male musicians
Søyr members
Geir Lysne Listening Ensemble members
Helge Lien Trio members